The 2010–11 FIS Cross-Country World Cup was a multi-race tournament over the season for cross-country skiers. It was the 30th official World Cup season in cross-country skiing for men and women. The season began on 20 November 2010 in Gällivare, Sweden and ended on 20 March 2011 in Falun, Sweden. The World Cup was organised by the FIS who also run world cups and championships in ski jumping, snowboarding and alpine skiing amongst others.

Calendar 
Both men's and women's events tend to be held at the same resorts over a 2 or 3 day period.

The Tour de Ski was a series of events which count towards the World Cup. This started with the meet at Oberhof and concluded at Val di Fiemme.

Men

Women

Men's team

Women's team

Men's standings

Overall

Women's standings

Overall

Nations Cup

Points distribution
The table shows the number of points won in the 2010–11 Cross-Country Skiing World Cup for men and women.

A skier's best results in all distance races and sprint races counts towards the overall World Cup totals.

All distance races, included individual stages in Tour de Ski and in World Cup Final (which counts as 50% of a normal race), count towards the distance standings. All sprint races, including the sprint races during the Tour de Ski and the first race of the World Cup final (which counts as 50% of a normal race), count towards the sprint standings.

The Nations Cup ranking is calculated by adding each country's individual competitors' scores and scores from team events. Relay events count double (see World Cup final positions), with only one team counting towards the total, while in team sprint events two teams contribute towards the total, with the usual World Cup points (100 to winning team, etc.) awarded.

Achievements
First World Cup career victory

Men
, 23, in his 7th season – the WC 6 (15 km C) in Davos; first podium was 2010–11 WC 2 (Sprint C) in Ruka
, 28, in his 7th season – the WC 8 (30 km F Mass Start) in La Clusaz; first podium was 2009–10 WC 3 (15 km C) in Ruka
, 28, in his 8th season – the WC 13 (Sprint F) in Toblach; first podium was 2006–07 WC 25 (Sprint F) in Borlänge
, 24, in his 5th season – the WC 19 (Sprint C) in Otepää; first podium was 2009–10 WC 3 (Sprint F) in Düsseldorf
, 24, in his 5th season – the WC 20 (20 km Pursuit) in Rybinsk; first podium was 2009–10 WC 11 (30 km Pursuit) in Rybinsk
, 20, in his 1st season – the WC 29 (15 km F Handicap Start) in Falun; also first podium

Women
, 24, in her 5th season – the WC 12 (10 km Pursuit) in Oberstdorf; first podium was 2009–10 WC 1 (10 km F) in Beitostølen

First World Cup podium

Men
, 23, in his 7th season – no. 2 in the WC 2 (Sprint C) in Ruka

Women
, 20, in her 3rd season – no. 2 in the WC 10 (10 km C Handicap Start) in Oberhof
, 24, in her 6th season – no. 2 in the WC 16 (9 km F Final Climb) in Val di Fiemme
, 20, in her 3rd season – no. 2 in the WC 19 (Sprint C) in Otepää

Victories in this World Cup (all-time number of victories as of 2010/11 season in parentheses)

Men
 , 6 (12) first places
 , 5 (10) first places
 , 3 (18) first places
 , 2 (17) first places
 , 2 (3) first places
 , 2 (2) first places
 , 1 (10) first place
 , 1 (4) first place
 , 1 (3) first place
 , 1 (8) first place
 , 1 (2) first place
 , 1 (2) first place
 , 1 (2) first place
 , 1 (1) first place
 , 1 (1) first place
 , 1 (1) first place
 , 1 (1) first place
 , 1 (1) first place

Women
 , 13 (52) first places
 , 6 (22) first places
 , 4 (24) first places
 , 3 (4) first places
 , 2 (3) first places
 , 2 (8) first places
 , 1 (2) first place
 , 1 (1) first place

References 

 
FIS Cross-Country World Cup seasons
World Cup 2010-11
World Cup 2010-11